{{Infobox election
| election_name = 1966 United States Senate election in South Carolina
| country = South Carolina
| type = presidential
| ongoing = no
| previous_election = 1960 United States Senate election in South Carolina
| previous_year = 1960
| next_election = 1972 United States Senate election in South Carolina
| next_year = 1972
| election_date = November 8, 1966

| image1 = 
| nominee1 = Strom Thurmond
| party1 = Republican Party (United States)
| popular_vote1 = 271,297		
| percentage1 = 62.2%| image2 = 
| nominee2 = Bradley Morrah 
| party2 = Democratic Party (United States)
| popular_vote2 = 164,955		
| percentage2 = 37.8%

| map_image = 1966 United States Senate election in South Carolina results map by county.svg
| map_size = 220px
| map_caption = County resultsThurmond:   Morrah: 

| title = U.S. Senator
| before_election = Strom Thurmond
| before_party = Republican Party (United States)
| after_election = Strom Thurmond
| after_party = Republican Party (United States)

}}

The 1966 South Carolina United States Senate election was held on November 8, 1966 to select the U.S. Senator from the state of South Carolina simultaneously with the special election to fill out the remainder of Olin D. Johnston's term.  Incumbent Senator Strom Thurmond, who had switched parties from Democratic to Republican in 1964, easily defeated state senator Bradley Morrah in the general election.

Democratic primary
The two Democrats who could have defeated Thurmond competed against each other in the special election to serve the remaining two years of Olin D. Johnston's six-year term.  As a result, little known state senator Bradley Morrah of Greenville won the South Carolina Democratic Party primary election on June 14 against John Bolt Culbertson to become the nominee in the general election.

Republican primary
Senator Strom Thurmond faced no opposition from South Carolina Republicans and avoided a primary election.

General election campaign
Morrah faced an uphill struggle against Senator Thurmond because the Democratic resources were primarily poured into the special election to help Fritz Hollings and in the gubernatorial contest for Robert Evander McNair.  Furthermore, Thurmond refused to debate Morrah and Thurmond boasted of the endorsements he received from Southern Democratic Senators Richard Russell, Jr., John C. Stennis, and Herman Talmadge.  Morrah was easily dispatched by Thurmond in the general election and he also lost re-election to his state senate seat.  He would never again hold public office, which was a routine occurrence for Thurmond's opponents. This was the first time South Carolina popularly elected a Republican senator.

Election results

 
 

|-
| 
| colspan=5 |Republican hold'|-

See also
List of United States senators from South Carolina
United States Senate elections, 1966
United States Senate special election in South Carolina, 1966
South Carolina gubernatorial election, 1966

References
"Supplemental Report of the Secretary of State to the General Assembly of South Carolina." Reports and Resolutions of South Carolina to the General Assembly of the State of South Carolina''. Volume II. Columbia, SC: 1967, pp. 16, 41.

South Carolina
1966
1966 South Carolina elections
Strom Thurmond